Alberto Zeni (born December 10, 1980) is a Mexican actor. He has participated in various Mexican telenovelas. He also appeared in the American film Ablution as Ibrahim (a Lebanese Muslim who was a Hezbollah bomber). In 2020 he started his second season on Narcos: Mexico. He currently resides in Los Angeles, California.

Filmography

References

External links

1980 births
Living people
Male actors from Monterrey